Colonel-in-chief is a ceremonial position in a military regiment. It is in common use in several Commonwealth armies, where it is held by the regiment's patron, usually a member of the royal family.

Some armed forces take other approaches to the position, appointing animals or characters as colonel-in-chief. The Norwegian Army, for example, appointed a penguin named Sir Nils Olav as a colonel-in-chief.

History 

Historically a colonel-in-chief was the ceremonial head of a regiment, usually a member of a European country's royal family.  The practice extends at least back to 1740 in Prussia when Frederick II held that position in the newly created Garde du Corps, an elite heavy cavalry regiment.

By the late 19th century the designation could be given to the children of royalty; there are pictures of the daughters of Russian Czar Nicholas II in the uniforms of their regiments. The German Kaiser Wilhelm II carried the title to an extreme, holding it in literally dozens of German and (by diplomatic courtesy) Austro-Hungarian, British, Russian, and Portuguese regiments. His mother, wife, son, and daughters were also full or deputy colonels-in-chief of various units.

Role 
In modern usage, the colonel-in-chief of a regiment is its (usually royal) patron, who has a ceremonial role in the life of the regiment. They do not have an operational role, or the right to issue orders, but are kept informed of all important activities of the regiment and pay occasional visits to its units. The chief purpose of the colonel-in-chief is to maintain a direct link between the regiment and the royal family. Some artillery regiments have a captain-general instead of a colonel-in-chief, but the posts are essentially the same.

The position of colonel-in-chief is distinct from the other ceremonial regimental posts of colonel of the regiment and honorary colonel, which are usually retired military officers or public figures with ties to the regiment.

Colonels-in-chief are appointed at the invitation of the regiment. While it is traditional for a royal personage to hold the position, it is at the discretion of each regiment whom they invite.

, most colonels-in-chief in the British Army are members of the British royal family. However, two foreign monarchs hold the position:
Abdullah II of Jordan - The Light Dragoons
Margrethe II of Denmark - The Princess of Wales's Royal Regiment (Queen's and Royal Hampshires)

In the past non-royal persons have held, or been invited to hold, the post of colonel-in-chief. The Duke of Wellington was colonel-in-chief of the regiment that bore his name. The Governor General of Canada Adrienne Clarkson was invited to be colonel-in-chief of Princess Patricia's Canadian Light Infantry, while the Royal Australian Army Medical Corps decided to ask the Governor-General of Australia to serve as its colonel-in-chief.

The role has spread to other armies in the Commonwealth of Nations, at least in countries which have royal families.

List of colonels-in-chief

Australia
Royal Australian Armoured Corps - King Charles III
Royal Australian Infantry Corps - vacant
Royal Regiment of Australian Artillery - vacant (styled Captain General)
Corps of Royal Australian Engineers - vacant
Royal Australian Corps of Signals - Anne, Princess Royal
Royal Australian Corps of Transport - Anne, Princess Royal
Royal Australian Army Medical Corps - The Governor-General of Australia
Royal Australian Army Ordnance Corps - vacant
Royal Australian Army Nursing Corps - vacant
Corps of Royal Australian Electrical and Mechanical Engineers - Vacant
Royal Australian Army Educational Corps - Birgitte, Duchess of Gloucester
Royal Australian Corps of Military Police - Camilla, Queen Consort

Bermuda
The Royal Bermuda Regiment - Birgitte, Duchess of Gloucester

Canada

Armoured
The Royal Canadian Dragoons - King Charles III
Lord Strathcona's Horse (Royal Canadians) - King Charles III
8th Canadian Hussars (Princess Louise's) - Anne, Princess Royal
The Prince Edward Island Regiment (RCAC) - Prince Edward, Duke of Edinburgh
South Alberta Light Horse - Sophie, Duchess of Edinburgh
The Saskatchewan Dragoons - Prince Edward, Duke of Edinburgh

Infantry

Princess Patricia's Canadian Light Infantry - The Rt Hon Adrienne Clarkson
The Queen's Own Rifles of Canada - Queen Camilla, Queen Consort
The Black Watch (Royal Highland Regiment) of Canada - King Charles III
The Royal Regiment of Canada - King Charles III
The Hastings and Prince Edward Regiment - Prince Edward, Duke of Edinburgh
The Lincoln and Welland Regiment - Sophie, Duchess of Edinburgh
The Grey and Simcoe Foresters - Anne, Princess Royal
The Lorne Scots (Peel, Dufferin and Halton Regiment) - Prince Edward, Duke of Kent
The Royal Winnipeg Rifles - King Charles III
The Essex and Kent Scottish - Prince Michael of Kent
The Royal Regina Rifles - Anne, Princess Royal
The Canadian Scottish Regiment (Princess Mary's) - Princess Alexandra, The Honourable Lady Ogilvy
The Irish Regiment of Canada - King Charles III
The Toronto Scottish Regiment (Queen Elizabeth the Queen Mother's Own) - King Charles III
Royal Newfoundland Regiment - Anne, Princess Royal

Personnel branches
Communications and Electronics Branch – Anne, Princess Royal
Royal Canadian Medical Service – Anne, Princess Royal
Royal Canadian Dental Corps – Birgitte, Duchess of Gloucester

Malaysia

Malaysian Army

Combat
Royal Malay Regiment - Sultan Sallehuddin of Kedah
Royal Ranger Regiment - Raja Sirajuddin of Perlis
Royal Armoured Corps - Sultan Mizan Zainal Abidin of Terengganu
Special Operations Regiment - Sultan Ibrahim Ismail of Johor

Combat Support
Royal Artillery Regiment and Royal Intelligence Corps - Sultan Muhammad V of Kelantan
Royal Regiment of Engineers - Sultan Nazrin Shah of Perak
Royal Signals Regiment - Muhriz, Yang Dipertuan Besar of Negeri Sembilan

Service Support
Royal Service Corps - Sultan Sallehuddin of Kedah
Royal Ordnance Corps - Sultan Mizan Zainal Abidin of Terengganu
Royal Electrical and Mechanical Engineers Corps - Muhriz, Yang Dipertuan Besar of Negeri Sembilan

Royal Malaysian Air Force
Royal Malaysian Air Force - Abdullah, King of Malaysia

Royal Malaysian Navy
Royal Malaysian Navy - Sultan Sharafuddin of Selangor

New Zealand
Royal Regiment of New Zealand Artillery - vacant (styled Captain-General)
Royal New Zealand Armoured Corps - vacant (styled Captain-General)
Royal New Zealand Infantry Regiment - vacant
Corps of Royal New Zealand Engineers - vacant
Royal New Zealand Corps of Signals - Anne, Princess Royal
Royal New Zealand Army Logistic Regiment - vacant
Royal New Zealand Army Medical Corps - The Duke of Gloucester
Royal New Zealand Nursing Corps - Anne, Princess Royal
Royal New Zealand Army Educational Corps - Birgitte, Duchess of Gloucester

Norway

His Majesty The King's Guard - Sir Nils Olav, a king penguin

Papua New Guinea
Royal Pacific Islands Regiment - King Charles III

United Kingdom

Cavalry

The Life Guards - King Charles III
The Blues and Royals (Royal Horse Guards and 1st Dragoons) - King Charles III
1st The Queen's Dragoon Guards - King Charles III
The Royal Scots Dragoon Guards (Carabiniers and Greys) - vacant
The Royal Dragoon Guards - King Charles III
The Queen's Royal Hussars (Queen's Own and Royal Irish) - vacant
The Royal Lancers (Queen Elizabeth's Own) - vacant
The King's Royal Hussars - Anne, Princess Royal
The Light Dragoons - The King of Jordan
The Royal Tank Regiment - vacant
The Royal Yeomanry - Princess Alexandra
The Royal Wessex Yeomanry - Prince Edward, Duke of Edinburgh
The Queen's Own Yeomanry - King Charles III
The Scottish and North Irish Yeomanry - vacant

Infantry
Grenadier Guards - HM King Charles III
Coldstream Guards - HM King Charles III
Scots Guards - HM King Charles III
Irish Guards - HM King Charles III
Welsh Guards - HM King Charles III
The Royal Regiment of Scotland - vacant
The Princess of Wales's Royal Regiment (Queen's and Royal Hampshires) - Queen Margrethe II of Denmark
The Duke of Lancaster's Regiment (King's, Lancashire and Border) - vacant
The Royal Regiment of Fusiliers - Prince Edward, Duke of Kent
The Royal Anglian Regiment - Prince Richard, Duke of Gloucester
The Yorkshire Regiment (14th/15th, 19th and 33rd/76th Foot) - vacant
The Mercian Regiment (Cheshire, Worcesters and Foresters, and Staffords) - King Charles III
The Royal Welsh - vacant
The Royal Irish Regiment (27th (Inniskilling) 83rd and 87th and The Ulster Defence Regiment) - vacant
The Parachute Regiment - King Charles III
The Royal Gurkha Rifles - King Charles III
The Rifles - Queen Consort Camilla
The Royal Gibraltar Regiment - HE Governor of Gibraltar

Combat Support
Army Air Corps - King Charles III
Corps of Royal Engineers - vacant
Intelligence Corps - Anne, Princess Royal
Royal Corps of Signals - Anne, Princess Royal
Royal Regiment of Artillery - vacant (styled Captain-General)

Combat Service Support
Adjutant General's Corps - vacant
Corps of Royal Electrical and Mechanical Engineers - Sophie, Duchess of Edinburgh
Queen Alexandra's Royal Army Nursing Corps - Sophie, Duchess of Edinburgh
Royal Army Dental Corps - Birgitte, Duchess of Gloucester
Royal Army Medical Corps - Prince Richard, Duke of Gloucester
Royal Army Veterinary Corps - Anne, Princess Royal
Royal Logistic Corps - Anne, Princess Royal
Small Arms School Corps - vacant

References

Military ranks
Honorary military appointments